Coe College is a private liberal arts college in Cedar Rapids, Iowa. It was founded in 1851 and is historically affiliated with the Presbyterian Church (USA). The college is a member of the Associated Colleges of the Midwest and the Association of Presbyterian Colleges and Universities.

History 
Coe College was founded in 1851 by Rev. Williston Jones as the School for the Prophets. While canvassing churches in the East to raise money for students to attend Eastern seminaries, Jones met a farmer named Daniel Coe, who donated $1,500 and encouraged Jones to open a college in Cedar Rapids. Coe's gift came with the stipulation that the college should offer education to both men and women, and when the Cedar Rapids campus opened in 1853 as the Cedar Rapids Collegiate Institute, it was a co-educational institution. In 1875, the college was reestablished as Coe College Institute and in 1881, after a private donation from T.M Sinclair, founder of the Sinclair Meat Packing Company, was finally founded as Coe College.

Coe was accredited by the North Central Association of Colleges and Schools in 1907.  In 1910, Presbyterian clergyman John Abner Marquis became president and initiated a period of growth that lasted for several years; Marquis was a sought-after speaker and served as Moderator in the Presbyterian Church.

Academics
Coe College awards the following degrees: Bachelor of Arts (B.A.), Bachelor of Music (B.M.), and Bachelor of Science in Nursing (B.S.N.). Coe offers more than 60 areas of study and provides the option for students to create their own major under the guidance of faculty members. Its most popular majors, based on 2021 graduates, were:
Business Administration and Management (36)
Psychology (35)
Biology/Biological Sciences (27)
Registered Nursing/Registered Nurse (23)
Physics (17)

Athletics
Coe College has 21 men's and women's athletic teams and is a member of the National Collegiate Athletic Association's Division III. Men's sports include baseball, basketball, cross country, football, golf, soccer, swimming & diving, tennis, track & field, and wrestling; women's sports include basketball, cross country, golf, soccer, softball, swimming & diving, tennis, track & field, and volleyball. Coe also supports five Co-Ed athletic teams. They include Archery, Cheer, Dance, Clay Target and Esports. Their athletic team name is the Kohawks, a stylized bird; the college mascot is known as Charlie Kohawk.

Stewart Memorial Library
Stewart Memorial Library contains more than 202,000 books and other materials. The library also features gallery spaces showing work by Iowa artists Marvin Cone, Conger Metcalf, and Grant Wood.

Student life
In 1972, a study found that Coe students had traditional values which were often in harmony with those of their parents.

Coe has an active Greek social community with five fraternities and five sororities. The groups, all of which are chapters of national organizations, include fraternities Lambda Chi Alpha, Phi Kappa Tau, Phi Mu Alpha Sinfonia, Tau Kappa Epsilon, and Sigma Lambda Beta; and sororities Alpha Omicron Pi, Alpha Sigma Alpha, Delta Delta Delta, Alpha Gamma Delta, and Sigma Lambda Gamma.

Writing center
Coe's Writing Center (CWC) is the largest undergraduate student-run writing center in the nation, with over 60 undergraduates on staff. It opened in 1986. The CWC now conducts over 2,000 student conferences a year. The CWC produces and distributes several small campus publications.

Notable alumni
 Fran Allison – the "Fran" in the 1950s TV series Kukla, Fran and Ollie
 Michael Boddicker – Grammy winning musician
 Janet M. Box-Steffensmeier - political scientist
 Wilmer D. Elfrink – college football and basketball coach 
 Paul Engle – director of the Iowa Writer's Workshop and the International Writer's Workshop, both at the University of Iowa
 Bill Fitch – head coach of various NBA teams, including 1981 NBA champion Boston Celtics
 Edgar S. Furniss – economist and educator
 Chris Funk  – guitarist and eclectic instrumentalist for The Decemberists 
 James William Good – US Congressman and Secretary of War
Dora Jane Hamblin – journalist, editor
 Fred Hickman – sportscaster, formerly of Turner Sports, ESPN and YES Network
 Timothy S. Hillman – U.S. District Court judge
 Fred Jackson – former NFL running back, Buffalo Bills and Seattle Seahawks
 Jason Kottke – blogger, designer
 Marv Levy – Pro Football Hall of Fame inductee; former coach for the Kansas City Chiefs and Buffalo Bills – former general manager for the Bills. 
Byron McKeeby – artist and professor at the University of Tennessee, known for lithography
 Curt Menefee – sportscaster, host of Fox NFL Sunday 
 Ronald Moon – Chief Justice of Hawaii Supreme Court (1993–2010)
 Dow Mossman – American writer, known for his novel The Stones of Summer.
 Edward A. Ross – sociologist 
Bradley Marc Sherrill - Director of the NSCL and scientific director at the Facility for Rare Isotope Beams. Awarded with the Tom W. Bonner Prize in Nuclear Physics.
 William Shirer – journalist, author of The Rise and Fall of the Third Reich and other books
 Gary Allan Sojka -  president of Bucknell University from 1984 to 1995.
 Lindsay Souvannarath - convicted of plotting a mass shooting in Halifax, Nova Scotia 
 Shelby Steele  – author, sociologist, political commentator 
 S. Donald Stookey –  inventor who had 60 patents in his name related to glass and ceramics, inventor of Fotoform and CorningWare 
 Gregory Alan Williams – actor and author

References

External links
 Official website
 Official athletics website

 
Education in Cedar Rapids, Iowa
Liberal arts colleges in Iowa
Universities and colleges affiliated with the Presbyterian Church (USA)
Educational institutions established in 1851
1851 establishments in Iowa
Private universities and colleges in Iowa